Spindle's End is a retelling of Sleeping Beauty by author Robin McKinley, published in 2000.

Plot summary
In McKinley's version of the classic fairy tale, Sleeping Beauty, a wicked fairy named Pernicia appears on the princess' name-day and places a curse on the baby, claiming that the child will, on her 21st birthday, prick her  finger on a spindle and fall into deathly sleep. The cursed princess is rescued on her name-day and secretly taken away by a young fairy, Katriona, to her village, a town called Foggy Bottom, located in the damp and swampy section of the country known as The Gig. There Katriona and her aunt (affectionately known as Aunt) raise the princess as an ordinary village maiden, naming her Rosie after the last of the princess' twenty-one names.

Throughout the book, Rosie grows from a headstrong, stubborn  child into an intelligent and courageous young woman. With the help of a rare talent—beast-speech, a small bit of magic unknowingly passed on from Katriona—and the silent encouragement of the town's taciturn blacksmith, Narl, Rosie becomes a talented and well-known horse leech, more inclined to wear breeches and whittle spindle ends than wear dresses and practice embroidery, as her more ladylike friend Peony does. However, when Rosie is 20 years old, Ikor, a mysterious powerful fairy, appears and reveals to Rosie that she is actually the country's hidden princess, and announces a plan to defeat Pernicia: a spell  will be cast over Peony and Rosie which switches their identities, but only until Rosie turns 21 and Pernicia's spell is broken.

In addition to the magic that infuses almost every aspect of the book, Spindle's End deals with the importance of family love, especially that between Rosie, Katriona, and Aunt, (and, later, the love between these  people and Katriona's husband and children, as the family grows) but also of Rosie's mother, the Queen, who longs for her lost daughter. Peony, Rosie's best friend, has a deep need to be loved and accepted by a family, because her adoptive parents don't care for her in the same way Rosie's adoptive family cares for her.

Animals also  play a central role in the book. Animals of various kinds help Katriona get Rosie to The Gig, a journey of about three months, and animals assist in the final defeat of Pernicia.

Connection to Other Works
Despite not being a sequel, it is implied that this book is set in the same world as McKinley's Damar books; at one point Damar and the character of Harimad-sol are mentioned as historical events, though from a different country. The events of McKinley's Deerskin are also referenced obliquely, as the Queen, Rosie's mother, is said to come from a country best known for the fleethounds bred by its king and queen.

Reception
F&SF reviewer Charles de Lint praised Spindle's End as "luminescent," characterizing the novel as "one of those rare occasions when the writing is so good, and the novel has so much heart, that the plot almost doesn't matter. That there is a strong storyline only adds to the book's unequivocal success."

References

External links
 Robin McKinley's website
 Study Guide to Spindle's End
 Essay on Spindle's End: "Real-izing Fantasy: The Double-Sided Mirror of Magical Realism and "the other side of reality" in Robin McKinley's Spindle's End" by Evelyn Perry, from The Looking Glass, vol. 8 no.3, September 2004
 Review of Spindle's End from School Library Journal, 2004

2000 American novels
American fantasy novels
Works based on Sleeping Beauty
Novels by Robin McKinley
Novels based on fairy tales